Crooked River is a waterway in Franklin County, Florida, that connects the tidal estuary of the Ochlockonee River to a junction with the tidal Carrabelle River and the New River above the town of Carrabelle, Florida.

The Crooked River is sometimes described as a principal tributary of the Ochlockonee River, while G.H. Dury described the Crooked River as a tidal channel connecting the Carrabelle River with the Ochlockonee River, separating St. James Island from the mainland.

Conservation
Florida approved the purchase of 13,000 acres of marshland along the Crooked River from St. Joe Company in 2003 for $14.5 million. The preserve was meant to help protect Florida black bear territory. The purchased land was added to Tate’s Hell State Forest.

References

Rivers of Franklin County, Florida
Rivers of Florida
Tributaries of the Ochlockonee River